Lawrence M. Gelb (January 15, 1898 – September 27, 1980) was an American chemist and businessman from New York City who along with his wife, Joan Clair, founded the Clairol hair-coloring company in 1931, now a division of Coty, Inc.

Their sons Richard L. Gelb and Bruce Gelb, have each held executive positions at pharmaceutical company Bristol-Myers Squibb, which purchased Clairol in 1957.

His legacy, the Lawrence M. Gelb Foundation, provides grants to worthy causes.

References

External links
 Clairol.com
 Finding that "Something Special" by Theresa Pease, Phillips Academy (Andover)

1898 births
1980 deaths
American chemists
20th-century American businesspeople
American cosmetics businesspeople
American Jews
Gelb family